The Tale of Kitty-in-Boots is a British children's book written by Beatrix Potter and illustrated by Quentin Blake published in 2016. The manuscript was discovered by Jo Hanks, a publisher at Penguin Random House Children's Books, in the Victoria and Albert Museum archive in 2015.

Development
Potter sent the manuscript to her publisher in 1914 and mentioned in letters that she intended to complete it; however, her work was interrupted by the outbreak of World War I and personal events such as her marriage and illness.

Plot
The story centres around "a well-behaved prime black Kitty cat, who leads rather a double life", and includes characters from other Potter stories, including Peter Rabbit, and Mrs. Tiggy-Winkle.

Publication
The book was published on 1 September 2016 by Frederick Warne & Co, the publisher of Potter's other works, which since 1983 has been an imprint of Penguin Group. The publication coincided with the 150th anniversary of Potter's birth.

See also

Puss in Boots (disambiguation)

References

External links
, Quentin Blake's copyrighted illustrations are not included

Kitty-in-Boots, The Tale of
British picture books
2016 children's books
British children's books
Books published posthumously
Kitty-in-Boots
Frederick Warne & Co books
Books about cats